Harvey House was a hotel and restaurant chain operated by the Fred Harvey Company in Santa Fe Railroad stations in the Western United States.

Harvey House may also refer to:

Harvey House buildings
Barstow Harvey House in Barstow, California
Harvey House at the Santa Fe Depot (San Bernardino, California) in San Bernardino, California
Harvey House at the  El Garces Hotel in Needles, the Mojave Desert, California
La Posada Hotel (Harvey House) and gardens in Winslow, Arizona
Belen Harvey House, in Belen, New Mexico; listed on the NRHP in Valencia County
Harvey Hotel (Gallup, New Mexico), New Mexico; listed on the NRHP in McKinley County, New Mexico
Harvey House at the Old Santa Fe Depot of Guthrie in Guthrie, Oklahoma
Waynoka Santa Fe Depot and Harvey House in Waynoka, Oklahoma; listed on the NRHP in Woods County, Oklahoma.
Harvey House (Florence, Kansas) in Florence, Kansas; listed on the NRHP in Marion County, Kansas
Castañeda Hotel in Las Vegas, New Mexico. Built in 1898 and finished in 1899.
The Plaza Hotel (Harvey House) is a hotel in Las Vegas, New Mexico. It was opened as an upmarket hotel for the booming town in 1882. Since then it has had a complex history. It is now registered on the National Register of Historic Places.
La Fonda Hotel in Santa Fe, New Mexico was purchased in 1925 by the Atchison, Topeka & Santa Fe Railroad and operated as one of the famed Harvey Houses.

Harvey + House
Harvey + House may also refer to other places in the United States:
Harvey-Niemeyer House, Florence, Arizona, listed on the NRHP in Pinal County, Arizona
William H. Harvey House, Windsor, Connecticut, listed on the NRHP in Windsor, Connecticut
Fred Harvey House (Leavenworth, Kansas), listed on the NRHP in Leavenworth County, Kansas
John Harvey House (Madisonville, Kentucky), listed on the NRHP in Hopkins County, Kentucky
Harvey House (Monroe, Louisiana), listed on the NRHP in Ouachita Parish, Louisiana
John Harvey House (Detroit, Michigan) in Detroit, Michigan; listed on the NRHP in Wayne County, Michigan
John Harvey House (Madisonville, Kentucky), listed on the NRHP in Hopkins County, Kentucky
Finks-Harvey Plantation, Roanoke, Missouri, listed on the NRHP in Howard County, Missouri
Matthew Harvey House, Sutton, New Hampshire, listed on the NRHP in Merrimack County, New Hampshire
Harvey Mansion, New Bern, North Carolina, listed on the NRHP in Craven County, North Carolina
Eli Harvey House, Clarksville, Ohio, listed on the NRHP in Clinton County, Ohio, home of sculptor Eli Harvey
William Harvey House, Chadds Ford, Pennsylvania, listed on the NRHP in southern Chester County, Pennsylvania
Nathan Harvey House, Mill Hall, Pennsylvania, listed on the NRHP in Clinton County, Pennsylvania
Peter Harvey House and Barn, Kennett Square, Pennsylvania, listed on the NRHP in southern Chester County, Pennsylvania
Boyd-Harvey House, Knoxville, Tennessee, NRHP-listed
Harvey House (Radford, Virginia), listed on the NRHP in Virginia
Harvey House (Huntington, West Virginia), listed on the NRHP in Cabell County, West Virginia

See also
John Harvey House (disambiguation)